Patrick Sutter may refer to:
 Patrick Sutter (ice hockey)
 Patrick Sutter (footballer)